Muireadhach ua Flaithbheartach, also known as Murchadh an Chapail Ua Flaithbheartaigh (died 1034-6), was King of Maigh Seóla.

Biography

The Annals of Inisfallen state 1027 - Muiredach Ua Flaithbertaig besieged Cathal, son of Ruaidrí, on Inis Crema in Loch Oirbsen, and divided his land despite him.

The Chronicon Scotorum states Muiredhach ua Flaitbertaigh king of the Ua mBriuin Sheola was treacherously killed.

Muireadhach was a grandson of Flaithbheartach, hence his suffix, which would become the surname Ua/Ó Flaithbheartaigh/O'Flaherty. The genealogies name his father as Maelcairearda; a person of this name died in 993, listed a king of Uí Briúin, but not explicitly as king of Uí Briúin Seóla. He is listed as having three sons – Ruaidhrí of Lough Cimbe, Donagh Aluinn and Aedh. From Ruaidhrí and Donagh would descended the eastern and western Ó Flaithbheartaigh's of Connemara.

See also

 Ó Flaithbertaigh

References

 West or H-Iar Connaught Ruaidhrí Ó Flaithbheartaigh, 1684 (published 1846, ed. James Hardiman).
 Origin of the Surname O'Flaherty, Anthony Matthews, Dublin, 1968, p. 40.
 Irish Kings and High-Kings, Francis John Byrne (2001), Dublin: Four Courts Press, 
 Annals of Ulster at CELT: Corpus of Electronic Texts at University College Cork
 Byrne, Francis John (2001), Irish Kings and High-Kings, Dublin: Four Courts Press, 

People from County Galway
1034 deaths
11th-century Irish monarchs
O'Flaherty dynasty
Year of birth unknown